Gloucester City Council is the local authority for the non-metropolitan district of Gloucester, in Gloucestershire, England.

Political control
Since the first election to the council in 1973 following the local government reorganisation under the Local Government Act 1972, political control of the council has been held by the following parties:

Leadership
The leaders of the council since 1995 have been:

Council elections
1973 Gloucester City Council election
1976 Gloucester City Council election
1979 Gloucester City Council election (New ward boundaries)
1980 Gloucester City Council election
1982 Gloucester City Council election
1983 Gloucester City Council election
1984 Gloucester City Council election
1986 Gloucester City Council election
1987 Gloucester City Council election
1988 Gloucester City Council election
1990 Gloucester City Council election
1991 Gloucester City Council election (New ward boundaries & city boundary changes also took place)
1992 Gloucester City Council election
1994 Gloucester City Council election
1995 Gloucester City Council election
1996 Gloucester City Council election
1998 Gloucester City Council election (New ward boundaries)
1999 Gloucester City Council election
2000 Gloucester City Council election
2002 Gloucester City Council election (New ward boundaries)
2003 Gloucester City Council election
2004 Gloucester City Council election
2006 Gloucester City Council election
2007 Gloucester City Council election
2008 Gloucester City Council election
2010 Gloucester City Council election
2011 Gloucester City Council election
2012 Gloucester City Council election
2014 Gloucester City Council election
2015 Gloucester City Council election
2016 Gloucester City Council election (New ward boundaries)
2021 Gloucester City Council election (Delayed from May 2020 due to Coronavirus)

By-election results

References

External links

 
Politics of Gloucester
Council elections in Gloucestershire
District council elections in England